Lochya Zala Re is a Marathi film directed by the duo Paritosh Painter and Ravi Adhikari. The film is based on Suresh Jairam's play of the same name 'Pati Sagle Oocha Pati'.

Plot 
In order to increase his allowance, Aditya, who settled in Birmingham has written to his uncle staying in Satara, that he is married although he is a bachelor. One-day uncle drops in unexpectedly in Birmingham. And Aditya is drawn into the vertex of intrigue when Uncle mistakes Pooja, Aditya's Best friend Manav's wife, as Aditya's wife & the neighbor's Ruby as Manav's wife. Aditya is basically honest and does not wish to deceive his uncle but.. does he have a choice. The Uncle is impressed by Pooja and also decides to steps up Aditya's allowance for choosing a pretty & sweet girl like Pooja to be his wife. Uncle also promises Pooja that he will step up the allowance further if they have a baby. This leaves Aditya with no choice but to carry on this act, very much to Manav Patel's discomfort. 

Further complications arise when Ruby, the neighbor PK's wife drops in at the house, and Uncle mistakes her for Manav's wife.  
Complications keep tumbling when the nightfall's, and it's time to retire. Who goes to bed with whom? Manav is irked when Aditya suggests that since the Uncle is home, he (Aditya) will have to spend the night with Pooja and is further annoyed when he (Manav) has to spend the night in the Maid's room.

The situation reaches its climax when Uncle nearly catches Manav sneaking into Aditya & Pooja's room.  
But the plot becomes more hilarious when the next-door drunkard neighbor P.K. drops in the bed with Uncle and is mistaken for someone else. The indescribable confusion that follows builds into a rich complexity of mistaken identities, splendid farcical situations, and a climax of comic wizardry.

From here on the permutations become so intricate that it seems impossible that Aditya, Pooja & Manav can ever sort them out. But miraculously they do, so hilariously that the audience will keep rolling with laughter till the movie ends. A fast, funny plot makes this rip-roaring farce easy & enjoyable for the entire family.

Cast 
Ankush Chaudhari as Aditya (Adi) Ghorpade
Siddhartha Jadhav as Maanav
Vaidehi Parashurami as Dimple/Pooja
Sayaji Shinde as Shambhunath Ghorpade (Kaka) 
Vijay Patkar as Dimple's father
Resham Tipnis as Ruby
Prasad Kandekar as Sandy

Production 
Talking about the film, Lochya Zaala Re is based on Suresh Jairam's play of the same name 'PATI SAGLE OOCHA PATI'. While speaking about his star cast, filmmaker Paritosh Painter said "The entire film was shot in London. I had a lot of fun working with Ankush, Siddharth, Vaidehi, Sayaji Shinde, and all the actors. On the one hand, they were all well-known artists, so it was very easy to work with them". It also features Sayaji Shinde, Vijay Patkar, Prasad Khandekar and Resham Tipnis in a pivotal role. Lochya Zaala Re was released on 4 February 2022.

References 

Ankush Chaudhari, Vaidehi Parshurami-starrer Lochya Zaala Re to be released on 11 February 2022
Poster Out : Lochya Zaala Re | Ankush Chaudhari | Siddharth Jadhav | Vaidehi Parashurami | Prasad K
4 फेब्रुवारीला "लोच्या झाला रे" होणार प्रदर्शित | Belgaav Kesari News | 19-01-2022
प्रेमाच्या महिन्यात येणार 'लोच्या झाला रे'
Lochya Jhala Re | 'लोच्या झाला रे’ चित्रपट ४ फेब्रुवारीला येणार प्रेक्षकांच्या भेटीला | Navarashtra (नवराष्ट्र)
Marathi entertainer 'Lochya Zaala Re' to release on February 4
प्रेमाच्या महिन्यात 'लोच्या झाला रे' ४ फेब्रुवारीला होणार प्रदर्शित
Confident about releasing Lochya Zaala Re on 4 February, says producer Naveen Chandra
Ankush Chaudhari, Vaidehi Parshurami and Siddarth Jadhav starrer comedy-drama 'Lochya Zaala Re' gets a new release date - Times of India
प्रेमाच्या महिन्यात होणार लोचा… लोच्या झाला रे 4 फ्रेबुवारीला प्रदर्शित
सिद्धार्थ व अंकुश येणार प्रेक्षकांच्या भेटीला,‘लोच्या झाला रे’चा भन्नाट टीझर प्रदर्शित
We aim to pull families to the theatres: Team 'Lochya Zhala Re'
लोच्या झाला रे
Lochya Zaala Re Marathi Movie Review | Ankush | Siddharth | Vaidehi | Mugdha | Resham | New 2022

External links

Reviews 

2020s Marathi-language films